Hero is a 2008 Indian Telugu-language action comedy film directed by actor G. V. Sudhakar Naidu (in his debut) and starring Nithiin, Bhavana, Ramya Krishna, Kota Srinivasa Rao, Brahmanandam, Nagendra Babu and others. Produced by Manyam Ramesh and the music was composed Mani Sharma. It was released on 24 October 2008 to mixed reviews.

The film was later dubbed into Malayalam as Police Academy and into Hindi as Ladenge Hum Marte Dum Tak (2011). And In Bhojpuri Ladab Hum Aakhiri Saans Tak.

Synopsis
Nagendra Naidu is a powerful police officer. He wants to see his son Radhakrishna a.k.a. Radha also as a good police officer. He always dreams of his son bashing the dons and get a state government's medal which should be presented through his hands. However, his wife Sarala wants to see her son as a super star. Then a peculiar GO gets passed by the state government by which any honest person is eligible for a Police job. As Nagendra Naidu convinces his wife that all the training that is needed for a film hero could be learnt in just three months time in the Police Academy, Sarala agrees to join him in the Police Academy. Radha falls in love with Krishnaveni alias Krishna at the police academy. The latter too loses her heart to him. At this juncture, her photo appears in the TV saying that she was a big Naxalite leader. 
The actual story gets revealed with a small twist. Was Krishna framed as a Naxalite or is she really a Naxalite? What happens to the love between Radha and Krishna? How far was Radha able to fulfil the dream of his father Nagendra Naidu? The answers to all these questions form the second half of the film.

Cast

 Nithiin as Radhakrishna/Radha
 Bhavana as Krishnaveni/Krishna
 Ramya Krishna as Triveni Naik (Police Academy Director)
 Kota Srinivasa Rao as Ram Mohan Rao
 Nagendra Babu as Nagendra Naidu
 Brahmanandam as Sr. Member at Police Training Academy
 Kovai Sarala as Sarala
 Tanu Roy
 Sree Vishnu
 Babu Mohan
 Ali Dasari Ravi
 Ajay
 Naresh
 Narsing Yadav
 Satyam Rajesh
 Sameer
 Fish Venkat
 Kapil Khanna
 Joginaidu
 Malladi Raghava
 Vizag Prasad

Songs
The music was composed by Mani Sharma and released by Aditya Music.

References

External links 

2000s Telugu-language films
2008 films
Films scored by Mani Sharma